is an original Japanese anime television series animated by Geno Studio and produced by Twin Engine. It is directed and written by Tetsuo Hirakawa, with Yasuharu Takanashi composing the music. It aired from July to September 2022 on Tokyo MX and BS11.

Plot
During Japan's Bakumatsu period, the Shinsengumi's Eighth Division is virtually annihilated by an imperialist criminal gang known as the Masked Demons. The sole survivor, Heisuke Toudou, is badly injured, losing a hand and a foot. Toudou is tasked by local feudal lord, Matsudaira Katamori, to maintain order, so he offers eight convicts who have been sentenced to death the chance to redeem themselves by abandoning their old names and becoming replacements for the eight dead Shinsengumi captains. Seven prisoners, Sakuya, Bou, Sougen, Gatarou, Suzuran, Akira and Ichibanboshi accept the offer, the eighth is immediately executed.

Characters

During his childhood, his parents and young brother were killed by a demon samurai with a distinctive mask. Since then, he has had a strong dislike of samurai and vowed to take revenge but was arrested for attacking one of the masked men and sentenced to death. He was one of the eight condemned criminals offered a chance by Heisuke Todou to take on the identity of a Shinsengumi captain and took the name of Isami Kondo. He has unkempt red hair and has an impulsive personality, but becomes the de-facto leader of the substitute Shinsengumi.

A young man who became an assassin after killing his abusive father who also mistreated his mother. He was tasked with killing the intellectual Shozan Sakuma but was betrayed and sold off as a criminal, and is now a target of his former employers, the Dark Slayers. He has a cool and calculating demeanor who lives only to kill. He became a substitute Shinsengumi with the identity of Toshizo Hijikata. 

He is the sole survivor of an attack on the Shinsengumi by a demon, losing his left eye, left arm, and left leg in the process. He works for the feudal lord, Matsudaira Katamori for whom he recruited substitute Shinsengumi from a group of condemned criminals. 

An accomplished young female swordswoman with long white hair masquerading as a man who takes the identity of Soji Okita in the substitute Shinsengumi.

A tall slim man with skills in medicine and science who was arrested for dissecting abandoned corpses and making euthanizing medicines. He takes the identity of Keisuke Yamanami in the substitute Shinsengumi. He is not a fighter, and his preferred weapon is self-made explosives.

He is a former Buddhist monk with purple hair who was arrested for conducting a Christian funeral service. He becomes Hajime Saito in the substitute Shinsengumi and his weapon is his staff. It was modified by Suzuran by embedding part of Hajime Saito's katana, Kijinmaru kinishige, into the tip and enhancing it with an electric current.

An older man with long thinning orange hair who takes the identity of Shinpachi Nagakura in the substitute Shinsengumi. His preferred weapon is a rifle with Shinpachi’s broken sword attached as a bayonet.

He is a physically huge man with flowing yellow hair who takes the identity of Sanosuke Harada in the substitute Shinsengumi. He has superhuman strength and wields a spear.

He is the commander of the organization Masked Demons that operates behind the scenes in Kyoto. He distributes masks and mystical swords to samurai in Kyoto. His true identity is Ichibanboshi's younger brother Tsukito who was taken and raised by the leader of the Masked Demons after he was forced to kill his mother to save his own life.

The lord of the Aizu clan and Kyoto shugoshoku, and founder of the Kaedama Shinsengumi.

An advisor to Matsudaira Katamori.

Episode list

Production and release
The original anime television series was announced on March 24, 2022. Tetsuo Hirakawa is directing the anime at Geno Studio, with Hirakawa also writing the scripts, and Yasuharu Takanashi composing the music. Original character designs are provided by Hiroyuki Takei, the author of Shaman King, while Masafumi Yokota adapts the designs for animation. The series aired from July 8 to September 23, 2022 on Tokyo MX and BS11. Crunchyroll has licensed the series.

References

External links
 Anime official website 
 

Anime with original screenplays
Crunchyroll anime
Historical anime and manga
Tokyo MX original programming
Samurai in anime and manga